The Jurong Bird Park Panorail was a  loop monorail system which ran within the Jurong Bird Park in Singapore. The system was constructed by Vonroll Transport Systems of Switzerland, which also built the Sentosa Monorail and Singapore Cable Car. Construction began in November 1990 and the system was launched by President Wee Kim Wee on 11 April 1992.

The monorail system used four fully air-conditioned four-car trains which travelled around the park in approximately 11 minutes. It ceased operations in 2012 and was replaced by a trackless tram service.

History

A monorail system was first mooted in 1988 when the Jurong Bird Park still utilised diesel trams to ferry visitors around the park. On 21 June 1990, a sign promoting a monorail development with two stations and four trains was sighted at the park. The proposed monorail would be Singapore's second monorail after the Sentosa Monorail which commenced operations in 1982. In September 1990, the executive director of the park, S.Thiruchelvam, said that a monorail would run silently and not emit pollution as it would be powered by electricity. It was also intended to facilitate closer contact between visitors and the birds.

The system was planned by Swiss engineering company Vonroll Transport Systems and construction began in November 1990. Its viaducts were painted in green to blend in with the natural environment. An unveiling ceremony for the trains was held on 16 September 1991. The system was also announced as a "panorail", a portmanteau of "panoramic" and "rail". It was launched by President Wee Kim Wee on 11 April 1992, the 21st anniversary of the park.

Part of the panorail's route entered an aviary, which was promoted as "the only one of its kind in the world". Four trains, with a four-car setup, ran at 3-5 minute frequencies between stations. The trains were fully air-conditioned and ran in a  loop around the park, with each loop taking approximately 11 minutes. A recorded commentary was played during the journey detailing places of interest. Its tinted windows extended from the knees to the roof. Stations were equipped with a single lift for handicapped visitors and train seats could be lifted for wheelchairs to back into.

The panorail ceased operations in 2012. The panorail was still listed on the official website as of 14 April 2012, but was replaced by a trackless tram service listing by 3 May 2012.

Stations
The panorail had three stations:
 Main Station, near the entrance and amphitheatre
 Lory Station, near the Lory Loft
 Waterfall Station, near the Waterfall Aviary and Jurong Falls

References

External links
 

1991 establishments in Singapore
Boon Lay
Panorail
Monorails in Singapore
Railway lines opened in 1991
Railways of amusement parks in Singapore
Von Roll Holding people movers